The Dallas City Council serves as the legislative body in the City of Dallas. It consists of 14 members. City council members are chosen by plurality elections in each of fourteen districts. The city operates under a council-manager system of local governance.

Current membership
The current members of the city council are:

† Denotes Mayor Pro Tem
‡ Denotes Deputy Mayor Pro Tem

References

Government of Dallas
Texas city councils